The UC Irvine Anteaters men's basketball team is the basketball team that represents the University of California, Irvine.  The team currently competes in the Big West Conference, NCAA Division I.

UC Irvine basketball is in its thirteenth year under current head coach Russell Turner. Turner was an assistant coach with the Golden State Warriors, before accepting the head coaching role at UCI in 2010. The Anteaters' main rivals are the Beach of Long Beach State. Program alumni include Portland Trail Blazers associate head coach Scott Brooks and professional football tight end Darren Fells.

Conference affiliations 
 1965–66 to 1976–77 – NCAA Division II Independent
 1977–78 to present – Big West Conference

Head coach history

Season-by-season records

Postseason results

NCAA Division I tournament results
The Anteaters have appeared in the NCAA Division I Tournament two times. Their combined record is 1–2.

NCAA Division II tournament results
The Anteaters have appeared in the NCAA Division II Tournament four times. Their combined record is 2–6.

NIT results
The Anteaters have appeared in seven National Invitation Tournaments (NIT). Their combined record is 2–7.

CIT results
The Anteaters have appeared in two CollegeInsider.com Postseason Tournaments (CIT). Their combined record is 4–2.

Honors and awards

Retired numbers

The Anteaters retired their first number in program history in 1995, honoring number 44 for All-American Kevin Magee. He was joined by Scott Brooks when his number 12 was retired on November 30, 2019.

Anteaters in the NBA

 Scott Brooks, 1988-1999, Cleveland Cavaliers, Dallas Mavericks, Houston Rockets, Minnesota Timberwolves, New York Knicks, Philadelphia 76ers
 Wayne Engelstad, 1988-1989, Denver Nuggets
 Ronnie Grandison, 1988-1996, Atlanta Hawks, Boston Celtics, Charlotte Hornets, Miami Heat, New York Knicks
 Ben McDonald, 1985-1989, Cleveland Cavaliers, Golden State Warriors
 Tod Murphy, 1987-1994, Detroit Pistons, Golden State Warriors, Los Angeles Clippers, Minnesota Timberwolves
 Johnny Rogers, 1986-1988, Cleveland Cavaliers, Sacramento Kings
 Bob Thornton, 1986-1996, Minnesota Timberwolves, New York Knicks, Philadelphia 76ers, Utah Jazz, Washington Wizards
 Tom Tolbert, 1988-1995, Charlotte Hornets, Golden State Warriors, Los Angeles Clippers, Orlando Magic

Notes

References

External links